Nolberto Freitas (born 26 January 1945) is a Uruguayan boxer. He competed in the men's middleweight event at the 1968 Summer Olympics.

References

1945 births
Living people
Uruguayan male boxers
Olympic boxers of Uruguay
Boxers at the 1968 Summer Olympics
People from Cerro Largo Department
Middleweight boxers